Portland Church is an ancient church located in County Tipperary, Ireland.

Location

Description
Portland Church is an early stone church with Romanesque features. The east window is very small and the sacristy at the rear is corbelled.

References

National Monuments in County Tipperary
Archaeological sites in County Tipperary